Parides cutorina  is a species of butterfly in the family Papilionidae. It is found in the Neotropical realm (Ecuador, Peru, and Brazil: Pará and Amazonas). It is an uncommon local species which may be threatened.

The larvae feed on Aristolochia.

Description from Seitz

P. cutorina Stgr. (female = mazeppa Grose-Smith) (3 c). Palpi red. Forewing of the male with a green spot; in the female without spot, the fringes spotted with white. Hindwing in the male with two contiguous red spots on the upper surface, the spots on the under surface yellowish white; in the female the wing has a yellowish white band on both surfaces; 2. and 3. radials close together, the transverse vein between them not oblique. — Upper Amazon and slopes of the Andes of Ecuador and Peru.

Description from Rothschild and Jordan(1906)
A full description is provided by Rothschild, W. and Jordan, K. (1906)

Taxonomy

Parides cutorina is a member of the anchises species group

The members are
Parides anchises 
Parides cutorina 
Parides erithalion 
Parides iphidamas 
Parides panares 
Parides phosphorus 
Parides vertumnus

References

Edwin Möhn, 2006 Schmetterlinge der Erde, Butterflies of the world Part XXVI (26), Papilionidae XIII. Parides. Edited by Erich Bauer and Thomas Frankenbach Keltern: Goecke & Evers; Canterbury: Hillside Books.  (Supplement 13 in English - by Racheli)
Lewis, H. L., 1974 Butterflies of the World  Page 26, figure 7, female.

External links
External images
Butterfly Corner Images from Naturhistorisches Museum Wien

Butterflies described in 1898
Parides
Papilionidae of South America
Taxa named by Otto Staudinger